This is a list of those who have held the post of Lord Lieutenant of County Dublin. 

There were lieutenants of counties in Ireland until the reign of James II, when they were renamed governors. The office of Lord Lieutenant was recreated on 23 August 1831. There was also a separate Lord Lieutenant of the City of Dublin. The title is pronounced as 'Lord Lef-tenant'.

Governors

 Nicholas Barnewall, 1st Viscount Barnewall: 1641– (died 1663)
 Simon Luttrell: 1687–1690 (1643–1698) (Jacobite)
 Edward Brabazon, 4th Earl of Meath: 1699–  (died 1707)
 Chaworth Brabazon, 6th Earl of Meath: (died 1763) 
 Luke Gardiner, 1st Viscount Mountjoy: (died 1798)
 Thomas St Lawrence, 1st Earl of Howth: (died 1801)
 Henry Lawes Luttrell, 2nd Earl of Carhampton: 1792–1821
 George Vesey: 1803 –1831
 Hans Hamilton: 1813–1822
 Thomas White –1831 : 
 Sir Compton Domvile, 1st Baronet: 1822–1831

Lord Lieutenants
 The 10th Earl of Meath: 7 October 1831 – 15 March 1851
 The 3rd Earl of Howth: 7 April 1851 – 4 February 1874
 The 4th Viscount Monck: 9 March 1874 – August 1892
 The 1st Baron HolmPatrick: 11 August 1892 – 6 March 1898
 The 13th Earl of Meath: 12 May 1898 – 1922

References

 
Lord Lieutenants
Former lieutenancies of Ireland
Lord Lieutenants
County Dublin, Lord Lieutenants
 Lord Lieutenants
Lord Lieutenants